The Ashkali Party for Integration (PAI) is an Ashkali political party in Kosovo registered on 5 November 2010.
Headquarters is located in Kosovo Polje.

Electoral performance

History
In the 2010 parliamentary elections the party received 0.2% of the vote and won one of the seats reserved for ethnic minorities. It retained its seat in the 2014, 2017, and 2021 elections. The party came to international attention in early 2021, when the Constitutional Court deemed the vote of PAI MP Etem Arifi during the confirmation of the cabinet invalid. Since this put the cabinet under the necessary majority threshold for confirmation, it led to a snap election.

References

4. https://europeelects.eu/kosovo|
Kosovo - Europe Elects

External links
Official website

Political parties of minorities in Kosovo
Ashkali